James Kerr Hibbs (born September 10, 1944) is an American former professional baseball player whose eight-year career was punctuated by a brief, three-game trial with the    California Angels of Major League Baseball. Hibbs was a catcher and outfielder by trade, but his MLB experience was limited to three pinch hitting appearances at the outset of the 1967 season.

Biography
Born in Klamath Falls, Oregon, Hibbs graduated from high school in Ventura, California, and played college baseball at Stanford University, where he was an All-American selection. He represented the United States in baseball at the 1964 Summer Olympics as a demonstration sport in Tokyo. During a series of games in Japan, he batted .379 with four home runs.

Hibbs was chosen in the third round of the secondary phase of the January 1966 Major League Baseball draft by the Los Angeles Dodgers. After hitting .309 with nine home runs during a year spent at the Rookie and Class A levels of the Dodgers' farm system, he entered the Rule 5 draft that fall, and the Angels acquired him. He remained on the Halos' 28-man, early-season roster when the 1967 American League season began and made his debut April 12 against Mickey Lolich of the Detroit Tigers, making a ground ball out to the second baseman in the ninth inning, pinch-hitting for veteran relief pitcher Jim Coates to make the final out in the Tigers' 6–3 win at Anaheim Stadium. In his other two plate appearances, Hibbs struck out against Darold Knowles of the Washington Senators on May 6, and fanned against Jim O'Toole of the Chicago White Sox on May 13. The three pitchers whom Hibbs faced were all left-handers.

Hibbs was sent to the minor leagues when rosters were cut to 25 men later in May and played the remainder of his pro career in the Angels', Cincinnati Reds' and Chicago Cubs' organizations, through 1973. He batted .271 with 43 home runs in 553 games played. A member of the Stanford Athletic Hall of Fame and the Ventura County Sports Hall of Fame, Hibbs has authored two books on baseball technique, A Catcher's Life and Instant Baseball.

References

External links

1944 births
Living people
All-American college baseball players
Asheville Tourists players
Baseball players from Oregon
California Angels players
El Paso Sun Kings players
Ogden Dodgers players
Olympic baseball players of the United States
People from Klamath Falls, Oregon
Quad Cities Angels players
San Jose Bees players
Santa Barbara Dodgers players
Sportspeople from Ventura County, California
Stanford Cardinal baseball players
Tacoma Cubs players
Wichita Aeros players